Christian Barbier (28 June 1924 – 3 November 2009) was a French film and television actor.

Barbier was born at Saint-Ouen, Seine (currently Seine-Saint-Denis), France.  During his career (1964 to 1997), he specialized in drama rather than comedy.  In film, he held several leading roles but is especially distinguished in auxiliary roles depicting more limited characters.  He is especially remembered for his first-class performance in Army of Shadows by Jean-Pierre Melville in 1969.  Appearing in a number of soaps and TV shows of the late 1960s to early 1980s, Barbier gained a certain notoriety thanks to the character of Joseph Durtol, bounded and proud hero of The Man of Picardy, the legendary French television series.  He died in Manosque (Alpes de Haute-Provence), aged 85.

Filmography

Films 

1956: Alerte au deuxième bureau (Jean Stelli) - Le professeur Verdier
1964: Lucky Jo (Michel Deville) - Le commissaire Odile
1964: Weekend at Dunkirk (Henri Verneuil) - Paul
1964: Marie Soleil (Antoine Bourseiller) - Le directeur de l'exploitation agricole
1965: La Vie de château (Jean-Paul Rappeneau) - French Colonel (uncredited)
1966: Maigret à Pigalle (Mario Landi) - Torrence
1966: Trans-Europ-Express (Alain Robbe-Grillet) - Lorentz
1966: L'Homme qui osa (The Man Who Dared) (Jean Delire)
1967: La Loi du survivant (Law of Survival) (José Giovanni)
1967: Lamiel (Jean Aurel) - Vidocq
1967:  (The Man Who Was Worth Millions) (Michel Boisrond) - Carl
1968: L'Homme à la Buick (The Man in the Buick) (Gilles Grangier) - Maxime
1968: Le Franciscain de Bourges (Claude Autant-Lara) - L'abbé Barret
1969: La désirade (Alain Cuniot) - Motorist
1969: Army of Shadows (Jean-Pierre Melville) - Guillaume Vermersch (“Le Bison”)
1969: L'Hiver (Winter ) (Marcel Hanoun) - Producer
1969: Target: Harry (Roger Corman) - Sulley Boulez
1970: The Horse (Pierre Granier-Deferre) - Léon
1970: Peace in the Fields (Jacques Boigelot) - Stanne Vanasche
1970: Les Jambes en l'air (Jean Dewever) - Marcel
1972: Les Tueurs fous (The Lonely Killers) (Boris Szulzinger) - Worker
1972: La chambre rouge (Jean-Pierre Berckmans) - René Noris
1973: Le Gang des otages (The Hostage Gang) (Édouard Molinaro) - Brigadier
1973: Les Granges brûlées (The Burned Barns) (Jean Chapot) - Gendarme
1973: L'Affaire Crazy Capo (Patrick Jamain)
1975: Only the Wind Knows the Answer
1977: Jambon d'Ardenne (Benoît Lamy) - Entrepreneur
1977: L'Homme pressé (Man in a Hurry) (Édouard Molinaro) - Cardiologist
1980: Trois hommes à abattre (Three Wanted Men) (Jacques Deray) - Liethard
1982: Hiver 60 (Thierry Michel) - André's father
1983: Le Voyage d'hiver (Marian Handwerker) - Corbin
1984: Julien Fontanes, magistrat (Daniel Moosmann) (TV Series) - Jeff Stenay
1985: Brigade des mœurs (Max Pécas) - Robert Capes
1986: Suivez mon regard (Jean Curtelin)
1988: La Maison assassinée (Georges Lautner) - Brigue
1991: L'Année de l'éveil (Gérard Corbiau) - Colonel
1993: Mayrig (Henri Verneuil) - Father Pignon
1994: Éternelles (Erick Zonca) (Short) - Father
1997: The Bet (Didier Bourdon and Bernard Campan)
2001: Une belle journée (A Beautiful Day) (Frédérique Dolphyn) (Short) - Jean
2002: Les Sabots de Vénus

1924 births
2009 deaths
French male film actors
French male television actors